343-line is the number of scan lines in some early electronic monochrome analog television systems. Systems with this number of lines were used with 30 interlaced frames per second the United States by from 1935 to 1938, and with 25 interlaced frames per second in the Soviet Union from 1937 onwards. A similar system was under development in Poland in 1939.

TV cameras where based on the iconoscope, the primary camera tube used in American broadcasting from 1936 until 1946, when it was replaced by the image orthicon tube. Earlier cameras used special spotlights or spinning disks to capture light from a single very brightly lit spot, and were not suitable for broadcasting of outdoor live events.

This early standard was soon replaced by 441-line systems.

United States 
343-line broadcasts where introduced by RCA and NBC on November 6, 1936. Tests started the previous year from New York City (W2XF on the Empire State Building), where NBC converted a radio studio in the Rockefeller Center for television use.

Several prototype TV sets were produced by RCA in 1936, but none was available commercially. Broadcasts were limited to public demonstrations in New York City (RCA) and Philadelphia (Philco) - to be exact, Philco demonstrated a 345-line system, but in practice both systems were identical.

The 343-line system was proposed for FCC approval by the Radio Manufacturers Association (RMA) in December 1937. Broadcasts were phased out the following year, in favor of a 441-line system.

Technical details:

Soviet Union 
A a similar 343-line system was tested in the Soviet Union (Moscow) from 1937 onwards. RCA provided broadcast equipment and documentation for the TV sets, that were then produced locally. The system was adapted for 50 Hz mains electricity, with a field rate of 50 Hz. The first experimental transmissions happened on March 9, 1937, followed by regular broadcasts on December 31, 1938.

Poland 
In 1939 a 343-line system was under development in Poland, publicly demonstrated during the Warsaw Radio Exhibition on August. Regular operations were planned for the beginning of 1940, but work stopped due to the outbreak of World War II.

References 

Television technology
History of television